The 1938 Pennsylvania gubernatorial election occurred on November 8, 1938. Incumbent Democratic governor George Howard Earle III was not a candidate for re-election. Republican candidate Arthur James defeated Democratic candidate Charles Alvin Jones to become Governor of Pennsylvania. Gifford Pinchot unsuccessfully sought the Republican nomination, while Thomas Kennedy unsuccessfully sought the Democratic nomination.

Results

|-
|-bgcolor="#EEEEEE"
| colspan="3" align="right" | Totals
| align="right" | 3,811,967
| align="right" | 100.00%
|}

References

1938
Pennsylvania
Gubernatorial
November 1938 events